Richard Bryce ( Maxwell; 4 November 1929 – 6 May 1971), known professionally as Dickie Valentine, was a British pop singer who enjoyed great popularity in Britain during the 1950s. In addition to several other Top Ten hit singles, Valentine had two chart-toppers on the UK Singles Chart with "Finger of Suspicion", featuring The Stargazers (1954) and the seasonal "Christmas Alphabet" (1955).

Biography

Early life

Valentine was born Richard Maxwell in November 1929 (his birth father was Dickie Maxwell) in Marylebone, London. He was known as Richard Bryce after his mother married Bryce.

Valentine's first acting job was at age only three when he appeared in the British comedy film  Jack's the Boy starring Jack Hulbert and Cicely Courtneidge

Music career

He developed a flexible vocal style and skills as an impersonator of famous singers. Actor-singer Bill O'Connor overheard him singing as a call boy at Her Majesty's Theatre in London and paid for his voice lessons.

He sang in clubs and learned stagecraft to help gain confidence and experience. While he was in his late teens, he was singing at the Panama Club one night when music publisher Sid Green saw him and brought him to the attention of bandleader Ted Heath.

On 14 February 1949, Valentine, an unknown, was signed by Ted Heath to join his band, Ted Heath and his Music, to sing alongside Lita Roza and Dennis Lotis. He was voted the Top UK Male Vocalist in 1952 while singing with the Ted Heath Orchestra, the most successful of all British big bands, and again after going solo in 1954.

In November 1954, Valentine was invited to sing at the Royal Command Performance, and in February 1955 he was top billed at the London Palladium. He also cracked jokes and impersonated entertainers, including Johnnie Ray, Frankie Laine, Mario Lanza and Billy Daniels. He recorded two number one hits, "Christmas Alphabet" and "The Finger of Suspicion (Points at You)". His first chart-topper came only two months after his marriage to Elizabeth Flynn at Caxton Hall, which caused scenes of hysteria and was widely expected to sound the death knell to his career. In fact, 1955 was by far his best chart year, with both the two number ones and three other's placed in the Top Ten.

While his second number one saw Valentine playing 'King Canute' to Bill Haley's incoming tide of rock and roll, "Christmas Alphabet" marked the first time in the UK that a song created for the Christmas market would hit number one. In April 1955, Valentine again topped the bill at the London Palladium for two weeks, a month after winning the male vocalist category in the NME poll. He went on to win this title consecutively from 1953 to 1957.

In 1961, he had a television series Calling Dickie Valentine. In 1966 Valentine partnered with Peter Sellers on the ATV sketch show The Dickie Valentine Show.

Although his fame began to wane during the 1960s, he remained a popular live performer until his death.

Death
After having played a concert at the Double Diamond Club in Caerphilly, Wales, Valentine was travelling back to a friend's home where he was staying, and was killed outright in a car crash on a single-lane bridge at Glangrwyney, near Crickhowell, Wales, on 6 May 1971, at the age of 41, together with pianist Sidney Boatman and drummer Dave Pearson, both aged 42.

He had lost control of the vehicle while attempting to take a dangerous, clearly marked bend. Even though he had travelled on that stretch of road many times and was familiar with its hazards, it was thought that his attention might have been distracted by conversation with his friends, in addition to fatigue, the crash having happened at 4:20am. There was also heavy fog in the area. The coroner returned a verdict of "death by misadventure". Valentine is interred at Slough Crematorium.

Plaque 

A commemorative plaque was unveiled on the new bridge on August 7, 2021, by his son Richard Valentine and other family members and friends of the three musicians.

Personal life

He married Elizabeth Flynn, a Scottish professional ice skater, in 1954. They had two children together, Richard (later a television director) and Kim, but divorced in 1967. Valentine married the actress Wendy Wayne in 1968. Prior to the car accident, Wayne and Valentine were scheduled to undertake a twenty-week summer season at the Water Splash in Jersey.

Discography

Albums 
 Presenting Dickie Valentine (Decca, 1954)
 Here Is Dickie Valentine (with the Skyrockets) (Decca, 1955)
 Over My Shoulder (Decca, 1956)
 Heartful of Song (Philips, 1967)
 The Great Dickie Valentine at the Talk of the Town (Philips, 1967)
 The World of Dickie Valentine (Decca, 1971)
 The Very Best of Dickie Valentine (Decca, 1984)
 The Voice (President, 1989)
 This Is Dickie Valentine (Music for Pleasure, 1992)
 My Favourite Songs (Savanna, 1992)
 The Best of Dickie Valentine (Sound Waves, 1994)
 Mister Sandman (See for Miles, 1995)
 The Very Best of Dickie Valentine (Spectrum, 1997)
 The Best of Dickie Valentine (Pulse, 1998)
 One More Sunrise (Castle Music, 2004)
 The Ultimate Collection (Spectrum, 2005)
 The Complete '50s Singles (Acrobat, 2010)

Singles

Filmography

See also
List of Christmas number one singles (UK)
List of number-one singles from the 1950s (UK)
List of artists under the Decca Records label
List of artists who reached number one on the UK Singles Chart
List of stage names

References

External links
 Dickie Valentine at 45-rpm.org
 

1929 births
1971 deaths
English male singers
English pop singers
English crooners
Traditional pop music singers
Road incident deaths in Wales
20th-century English singers
20th-century British male singers